The Blind Woman of Sorrento (Italian: La cieca di Sorrento) is a 1934 Italian drama film directed by Nunzio Malasomma and starring Dria Paola, Corrado Racca and Dino Di Luca. It is an adaptation of the 1852 novel of the same title by Francesco Mastriani. The novel has been adapted into film on two other occasions: the 1916 silent The Blind Woman of Sorrento and 1953's The Blind Woman of Sorrento.

Cast
 Dria Paola as Beatrice di Rionero 
 Corrado Racca as Prof. Filippo Morisoni 
 Dino Di Luca as Ernesto Basileo, il notaio 
 Anna Magnani as Anna, la sua amante 
 Mario Steni as Oliviero Simon / Carlo Baldieri 
 Giulio Tempesti as Il marchese di Rionero 
 Diana Lante as La marchesa Albina di Rionero 
 Miranda Bonansea as Beatrice, la bambina 
 Adolfo Geri as Giovannino 
 Vera Dani as Maria Luisa 
 Giotto Tempestini as Il precettore 
 Fernando De Crucciati as Ferdinando Maria Baldieri 
 Carlo Duse as Emisario borbonico 
 Giulio Gemmò as Don Giacomo Sordi 
 Leo Bartoli as Don Gesualdo
 Vittorio Tettoni 
 Fulvia Gerbi
 Ada Cannavò

References

Bibliography 
 Moliterno, Gino. Historical Dictionary of Italian Cinema. Scarecrow Press, 2008.

External links 
 

1934 films
Italian historical drama films
1930s historical drama films
1930s Italian-language films
Films directed by Nunzio Malasomma
Films based on Italian novels
Films set in Sorrento
Films set in the 19th century
Films about blind people
Italian black-and-white films
1934 drama films
1930s Italian films